Claughaun Gaelic Athletic Club is a Gaelic Athletic Association club within Limerick GAA, based in St Brigid's parish on the southside of Limerick City, Ireland. The club was founded  in 1902, in the Poulin/Pennywell area of St John's parish. It has considerable success over the years in both hurling and Gaelic football. The club grounds are located on the Childers Road, at what has become a prominent venue for games of all levels. The club was relegated to intermediate status in both football and hurling following the 2010 championships. Clauaghaun returned to the Limerick Senior Football Championship after winning the 2020 Limerick Intermediate Football Championship.

The Irish name 'Clochán' is said to mean 'the place of the stepping stones', which referred to a small stream that flowed where the modern day Dublin Road lies, at Clare Street. Claughaun have contributed many notable players to various representative sides, in both codes.

Claughaun is a successful club and once again has significant talent. They have had the greatest history in Limerick.

Hurling
The club won its first Limerick Senior Hurling Championship in 1914, and went on the claim the title again in 1915, 1916, 1918 and 1926. In all Claughaun have won the SHC on ten occasions, the most recent title coming in 1986. 
They also won their most recent IHC Final against South Liberties GAA in 2006.

Honours

Limerick Senior Hurling Championship (10)
1914, 1915, 1916, 1918, 1926, 1957, 1958, 1968, 1971, 1986
Limerick Minor Hurling Championship (8)
1946, 1956, 1961, 1962, 1978, 1981, 1986, 1991
 Limerick Under-21 Hurling Championship (3)
 1981, 1984, 1987
 Limerick Intermediate Hurling Championship (1)
 2006
 Limerick Junior Hurling Championship (4)
 1904, 1912, 1918, 1929

Notable players
Eamonn Cregan, one of Limerick's most versatile hurlers ever, won the All-Ireland Senior Hurling Championship with the county in 1973, after a commanding performance at centre half-back. 
Michael Cregan trained the 1973 Limerick team, whose panel also included Claughaun's Andy Dunworth and Mick Graham, the latter of whom missed much of the victorious campaign through injury. 
Mickey Cross, one of the most famous of all Claughaun men, won All-Ireland Senior Hurling titles in 1934 and 1936 with Limerick. 
Danny Fitzgerald secured National Hurling League winner's medals in 1984 and 1985 with Limerick
Mike Galligan won Munster Senior Hurling Championship medals in 1994 and 1996.
Gus Ryan captained his county to the All-Ireland Under-21 Hurling Championship in 1987, on a team that included fellow club players Leo O'Connor and Andy Cunneen. .

Gaelic football
Claughaun captured the Limerick Senior Football Championship for the first time in 1955, and followed up with another 13 SFC title wins over the following four decades, the last in 1996.

Honours
Limerick Senior Football Championship (14)
1955, 1959, 1967, 1969, 1970, 1971, 1982, 1984, 1986, 1988, 1989, 1993, 1995, 1996, 2023
Limerick Minor Football Championship (6)
1946, 1956, 1961, 1962, 1973, 1985
 Limerick Junior Football Championship (2)
 1945, 1972
 Limerick Under-21 Football Championship (2)
 1980, 1982
 Limerick Intermediate Football Championship (1)
 2020

Notable players
Danny Fitzgerald (see also under Hurling) represented Munster GAA in the Railway Cup in the 1980s.Eamonn Cregan All Ireland winner 1973 Munster hurling championship winner, Railway Cup Winner and All Star, manager of all Ireland winners.

References

External links 
 Claughaun GAA website

Gaelic games clubs in County Limerick
Hurling clubs in County Limerick
Gaelic football clubs in County Limerick